The 2018 Pan American Youth Olympic Games Qualifier for girls' field hockey, also known as 2018 Youth Pan American Championship was the third edition of the Youth Pan American Championship, an international field hockey competition held from 12 – 17 March 2018 in Guadalajara, Mexico.

The tournament also served as a direct qualifier for the 2018 Summer Youth Olympics, with the winner and runner-up qualifying. However, since Argentina has already qualified as the hosts, but also won this competition, the second and third-placed teams (Uruguay and Mexico) qualified for the Summer Youth Olympics.

Qualified teams

Format
The six teams will all be competing in one pool. The top four teams advance to the semifinals to determine the winner in a knockout system. The bottom two teams play for the 5th/6th place.

Each game lasts for 20 minutes

Results
All times are local (UTC−05:00).

Preliminary round

Pool A

Fifth/sixth place classification

First to fourth place classification

Semifinals

Third and fourth place

Final

Final standings

References

Pan American Youth Olympic Games Qualifier (girls' field hockey)
Field hockey at the 2018 Summer Youth Olympics
International women's field hockey competitions hosted by Mexico
Pan American Youth Olympic Games Qualifier (girls' field hockey)
[[Category:2018 in Mexican sports|Pan American Youth Olympic Games Qualifier (girls' field hockey)]